The Yarmouk River (or Yarmuk River) is the largest tributary of the Jordan River.

Yarmouk or Yarmuk may also refer to:

History
 Battle of Yarmouk, a major battle between Arab Muslim forces and the armies of the Eastern Roman-Byzantine Empire in 636
 Yarmukian culture, a Neolithic archaeological culture of the ancient Levant
 Yarmouk munitions factory explosion, an alleged Israeli air strike against a munitions factory in Sudan in October 2012

Sport
 Al-Yarmouk SC (Syria), a Syrian professional sports-football club founded in 1925
 Al-Yarmouk FC (Jordan), a Jordanian football club founded in 1959
 Al-Yarmouk SC (Kuwait), a Kuwaiti professional sports-football club founded in 1965
 Al Yarmuk Al Rawda, a Yemeni football club founded in 1978
 Al-Yarmouk (Libya), a Libyan football club

Education
 Al-Yarmouk Teaching Hospital, a hospital and part of a medical college, founded in 1964 in Baghdad, Iraq
 Yarmouk University, a state university founded in 1976 in Irbid, Jordan
 Al Yarmouk University College, a private Iraqi university founded in 1996 in Diyala, Iraq

Places
 Yarmouk Camp, a district in Damascus, Syria, populated by Palestinian refugees
 Yarmouk, Baghdad, an upscale neighborhood in Iraq
 Yarmouk, Kuwait, a suburb of the capital of Kuwait
 Yarmouk, al-Hasakah Governorate, a town in the al-Hasakah Governorate of Syria
 Yarmouk, Israel, a ruin believed to be the biblical Jarmuth

Other
 Yarmuk Jamaat, an Islamic extremist organization connected to numerous terrorist attacks, according to the Russian Federal Security Service